Platyscapa is a genus of 19 species of pollinating fig wasps found in Africa and Madagascar, Middle East, southern Asia and the Indo-Pacific islands.  They are pollinators of Ficus species belonging to subsections Conosycea and Urostigma.

Species 
Platyscapa awekei Wiebes, 1977
Platyscapa arnottiana Abdurahiman, 1980
Platyscapa bergi Wiebes, 1986
Platyscapa corneri Wiebes, 1980
Platyscapa coronata (Grandi, 1928)
Platyscapa binghami Wiebes, 1980
Platyscapa desertorum Compton, 1990
Platyscapa etiennei Wiebes, 1977
Platyscapa fischeri Wiebes, 1977
Platyscapa frontalis Motschulsky, 1863
Platyscapa hsui Chen & Chou, 1997
Platyscapa indica Priyadarsanan & Abdurahiman, 1997
Platyscapa innumerabilis (Fullaway, 1913)
Platyscapa ishiiana (Grandi, 1923)
Platyscapa paschimaghatensis Priyadarsanan & Abdurahiman, 1997 
Platyscapa quadraticeps (Mayr, 1885)
Platyscapa sahiana Priyadarsanan & Abdurahiman, 1997 
Platyscapa tjahela (Abdurahiman & Joseph, 1975) 
Platyscapa soraria Wiebes, 1980

References 

Agaonidae
Hymenoptera genera